The Doria Madonna is a c.1525 oil on panel painting by Parmigianino, now in the Galleria Doria-Pamphili in Rome. Its shape and dimensions show it to form a diptych with the Nativity with Angels in the same gallery. A smaller autograph version also survives in the Uffizi.

References

1525 paintings
Collections of the Doria Pamphilj Gallery
Paintings of the Madonna and Child by Parmigianino
Paintings in the collection of the Uffizi